Brigadier Sir Christopher Henry Maxwell Peto, 3rd Baronet,  (19 February 1897 – 19 May 1980) was a senior officer in the British Army during the Second World War and a post-war Conservative Party politician.

Early life
Peto was born in Chertsey, Surrey, on 19 February 1897, the son of Sir Basil Peto, 1st Baronet and Mary Matilda Annie (née Baird).

Military service
Peto graduated from the Royal Military College, Sandhurst and was commissioned a second lieutenant in the 9th Queen's Royal Lancers on 11 August 1915. He served in both the First World War and Second World War, attaining the rank of brigadier.

Peto took command of the 9th Queen's Royal Lancers in October 1938, being one of the few officers in the regiment to have seen action in the First World War. He was tasked with carrying on the mechanised training of the regiment in the buildup to the war, to mobilise it when war came and to take it to France in May 1940.

The regimental history of the Lancers has this description of him in its foreword:

When the regiment deployed to France it was not well equipped and this was partly the reason for Peto becoming wounded:

As well as being awarded the Distinguished Service Order, Peto also received:

 3 Mentioned in Despatches
 French Knight of the Legion of Honour
 French Croix de Guerre with palm
 Belgian Commander of the Order of Leopold
 Belgian Croix de Guerre with palm
 Czech Commander of the Order of the White Lion
 Czech War Cross
 Luxembourg Commander of the Order of Adolphe of Nassau
 Luxembourg War Cross
 Polish Commander's Cross of the Order of Polonia Restituta

Political career
At the 1945 general election, Peto was elected as the Member of Parliament for Barnstaple. For the 1950 general election, the Barnstaple constituency was abolished, and Peto was returned instead for the newly recreated Devon North constituency, where he served until the 1955 general election.

In 1966, Peto was appointed the High Sheriff of Wiltshire for the year. He inherited the baronetcy created for his father in 1977, upon the death of his elder brother.

Peto died at Basingstoke, Hampshire, aged 83 in 1980. The title was inherited by his son, Michael, who became the 4th Baronet. Michael had three sons and the elder of these, Henry, is the 5th and current Baronet of this creation. The other Peto baronetcy, created for Peto's grandfather, is also still extant in the senior branch of the family.

References

External links

UK Parliamentary Photograph
Generals of World War II

1897 births
1980 deaths
Baronets in the Baronetage of the United Kingdom
Conservative Party (UK) MPs for English constituencies
Deputy Lieutenants of Devon
High Sheriffs of Wiltshire
UK MPs 1945–1950
UK MPs 1950–1951
UK MPs 1951–1955
British Army personnel of World War I
British Army brigadiers of World War II
9th Queen's Royal Lancers officers
Companions of the Distinguished Service Order
Recipients of the Croix de Guerre 1939–1945 (France)
Recipients of the Legion of Honour
Recipients of the Croix de guerre (Belgium)
Recipients of the Order of Polonia Restituta
Recipients of the Order of the White Lion
Members of the Parliament of the United Kingdom for Barnstaple
Military personnel from Surrey
Graduates of the Royal Military College, Sandhurst